"Welcome to the Future" is a 2009 country music song by Brad Paisley.

Welcome to the Future may refer to:

 "Welcome to the Future" (The Future Is Wild episode), n episode of the television series The Future Is Wild
 Welcome to the Future (festival), an underground music festival held annually in the Netherlands